Saluja is an Indian (Arora) surname. It may refer to:
Harish Saluja
Renu Saluja (1952–2000), Indian film editor
Sukhpreet Saluja

Indian surnames
Punjabi-language surnames
Surnames of Indian origin
Hindu surnames
Khatri clans
Khatri surnames
Arora clans